The TDK Australian Audio Book Awards were established by the National Library of Australia in 1988 and sponsored by TDK from 1991. They were the leading audio book awards in Australia between 1989 and 1999, and were open to both commercial and non-commercial publishers.

The aims were: to improve the quality of Australian audio book production by recognising the achievements of the producers/publishers and narrators; to increase public awareness of books in this format; and to promote consumer access to a wide range of Australian audio books.

Winners

Notes

References
"TDK Audio Book Awards. And the winners are ..." in Gateway. No. 42, December 1999 Accessed 3 July 2007
TDK Australian Audio Book Awards – Archived Page Accessed 3 July 2007

Australian literary awards
Awards established in 1988
Audiobook awards